Wang Chunguang (born 15 January 1967) is a Chinese wrestler. He competed in the men's freestyle 130 kg at the 1992 Summer Olympics.

References

External links
 

1967 births
Living people
Chinese male sport wrestlers
Olympic wrestlers of China
Wrestlers at the 1992 Summer Olympics
Place of birth missing (living people)
Wrestlers at the 1990 Asian Games
Asian Games competitors for China
21st-century Chinese people
20th-century Chinese people